Pan American Stadium is a 5,000 seat multi-purpose outdoor stadium, located in City Park, in New Orleans, Louisiana. It is used for soccer, American football, lacrosse and rugby. It is currently home to the New Orleans Jesters of the National Premier Soccer League (NPSL) and Motagua New Orleans of the Gulf Coast Premier League. The stadium also plays host to LHSAA football games and soccer matches.

History
In 2005, Hurricane Katrina flooded the stadium. It was renovated and re-opened in 2008. A FieldTurf playing surface was installed at the stadium, along with new bleachers, new press box, new scoreboard and renovated locker rooms. The renovations were provided in part by the National Football League Youth Football Fund on behalf of the New Orleans Saints.

The Allstate Sugar Bowl Collegiate Lacrosse Series was held at the stadium from 2011 to 2015.

The New Orleans Privateers club football team played at the stadium in 2012.

In 2015, the stadium hosted the high school rugby state championship.

Gallery

See also
 City Park (New Orleans)
 List of soccer stadiums in the United States

References

External links
 New Orleans City Park
 New Orleans Jesters

American football venues in New Orleans
High school football venues in the United States
High school football venues in Louisiana
Lacrosse venues in Louisiana
National Premier Soccer League stadiums
New Orleans Jesters
New Orleans Privateers football
New Orleans Storm
Rugby union stadiums in New Orleans
Soccer venues in New Orleans
Sports venues completed in 1973
1973 establishments in Louisiana